As of 2011, the Oklahoma City metropolitan area is the 44th-largest media market in the United States, as ranked by Nielsen Media Research, with 712,630 television households (0.6% of all U.S. homes) and 1.2 million people aged 12+. The following is a summary of broadcast and print media in Oklahoma City:

Newspapers and magazines

The major daily newspaper published in Oklahoma City is The Oklahoman, which has the largest circulation of the state's newspapers. There are also a number of regional and special-interest newspapers such as the Black Chronicle, the Oklahoma Gazette and The Journal Record.

Daily
The Journal Record
The Oklahoman

Weekly
Baptist Messenger
Bethany Tribune
Choctaw Times
Black Chronicle
The Capitol Hill Beacon
El Latino American (Spanish)
El Nacional (Spanish)
OK VIETIMES (Vietnamese)
Oklahoma Chinese Times (Chinese)
The Oklahoma City Herald
Oklahoma Gazette
Sooner Catholic

Community

Choctaw Sun
Eastern Oklahoma County News (Harrah)
The Edmond Sun
Harrah Sun
Jones Sun
Luther Sun
Midwest City Beacon
Moore Monthly
Nicoma Park Sun
Spencer Sun
The Vista (Edmond)

Business, legal, entertainment and other local periodicals

Apartment Locator
The Brides of Oklahoma
The Campus (Oklahoma City University)
The City Sentinel
distinctly Oklahoma Magazine
Durocher's Oklahoma City Business Report
Edmond Life and Leisure
Edmond Outlook
EscapeOKC Magazine
The Gayly Oklahoman
Gossip Boy
House & Home Magazine
The Journal Record
KeyOKC
MetroFamily Magazine
 Moore Monthly
Nuestra Comunidad Oklahoma (bilingual)
OCU LAW Magazine (Oklahoma City University)
OKC N Style Magazine
okcBIZ
Oklahoma Banker
Oklahoma City Apartments
Oklahoma City Friday
Oklahoma City Guide
Oklahoma City News
Oklahoma Constitution
Oklahoma County News
Oklahoma Gazette
Oklahoma Living
Oklahoma News
Oklahoma Senior Life News
Oklahoma Today
Oklahoma Woman Magazine
Oklahoma's Nursing Times
Outdoor Oklahoma
Preview Magazine
Pure Magazine
405 Magazine, formerly Slice Magazine
So6ix
TalkOKC
Tinker Take Off (Tinker Air Force Base)
The Vista (University of Central Oklahoma)
Universal Republic (online only)
VYPE High School Sports Magazine

Defunct newspapers and publications
Bethany News
The Black Dispatch
Mid City Advocate
Northwest Metro Times
Oklahoma City Times

Digital media
OKC Talk
The Lost Ogle
Non Doc

TV 
Oklahoma City, the capital and largest city of the U.S. state of Oklahoma, is the 44th largest designated market area for television in the United States (as ranked by Nielsen Media Research); the DMA serves 34 counties in the northern, west-central and central portions of the state. The Oklahoma City area has 19 television stations, including 12 full-power and six low-power (analog or digital) stations:

Full-power 
 4 KFOR-TV Oklahoma City (NBC)
 5 KOCO-TV Oklahoma City (ABC)
 9 KWTV-DT Oklahoma City (CBS)
 12 KWET-TV Cheyenne (PBS)
 13 KETA-TV Oklahoma City (PBS)
 14 KTBO-TV Oklahoma City (TBN)
 25 KOKH-TV Oklahoma City (Fox)
 30 KTUZ-TV Shawnee (Telemundo)
 34 KOCB Oklahoma City (The CW)
 35 KUOK Woodward (Univision)
 43 KAUT-TV Oklahoma City (Independent)
 46 KOCM Norman (Daystar)
 52 KSBI Oklahoma City (MyNetworkTV)
 62 KOPX-TV Oklahoma City (Ion Television)

Low-power 
 21 KUOT-CD Oklahoma City (3ABN)
 22 KTOU-LD Oklahoma City (beIN Sports Xtra)
 24 KOMI-CD Woodward (YTA TV)
 31 KLHO-LD Oklahoma City (Spanish religious independent)
 36 KUOK-CD Oklahoma City (Univision)
 45 KOHC-CD Oklahoma City (Azteca America)
 47 K35MV-D Concho (FNX)
 48 KUOC-LD Enid (Infomercials)
 48 KOCY-LD Oklahoma City (Estrella TV)

Cable
 Bally Sports Oklahoma
 YurView Oklahoma

Subscription television
The Oklahoma City Metropolitan Statistical Area (MSA) is primarily served by Cox Communications for cable television and AT&T U-verse for Internet Protocol television. Cox Communications parent Cox Enterprises was awarded the cable franchise rights to Oklahoma City proper by the Oklahoma City Council in February 1979, and commenced service in the city in April 1980. Until the latter system's dissolution in December 1983, cable service in the immediate Oklahoma City area was split between the main Cox Cable system and Pan Oklahoma Communications, a joint venture that was 80% owned by Cox Enterprises (the same equity stake it initially held with the western Oklahoma City Cox franchise) with the remaining 20% owned by seven majority stockholders and four minority stockholders based in the city. In 1984, Cox Communications acquired 10% of the remnant shares owned by the six local shareholders in Cox Cable of Oklahoma City, which expanded its service area into areas of northeastern Oklahoma City (located east of Western Avenue, the service delineation point for both systems) as well as the bordering unincorporated community of Forest Park that had previously been served by Pan Oklahoma.

Multimedia Cablevision served as the cable provider for the city's suburbs and adjacent areas (including among others, Bethany, Edmond, Guthrie, Midwest City-Del City, Choctaw, Harrah, Moore, Nichols Hills, Norman and Yukon). Multimedia first incorporated in the metropolitan area when it established a system in Moore and Del City in 1979; the company expanded its service area in 1983, when it acquired the American Cablevision systems in Norman (which launched in 1976 as the first cable provider in the Oklahoma City metropolitan area), Midwest City/Spencer (incorporated in July 1979), Stillwater and Cushing from American Television and Communications Corporation (AT&C) in a trade deal involving two AT&C-owned systems in North Carolina. Cox Communications would purchase Multimedia's suburban Oklahoma City systems from the Gannett Company (as part of a $2.7-billion acquisition of its systems in Oklahoma, Kansas and North Carolina) in July 1999, with those systems formally being taken over by Cox on February 1, 2000. AT&T U-verse rolled out its Internet Protocol television service to portions of Oklahoma City, Edmond, Moore and Norman in August 2007; U-verse would expand its service into additional suburban communities (including Midwest City, Mustang, Nichols Hills, The Village, Wheatland and Yukon) by the summer of 2008.

From 1978 until 1984, Oklahoma City was also served by TV-Q Movie Systems, a Multichannel Multipoint Distribution Service which was the first provider to offer pay television service in Oklahoma City proper; TVQ – which transmitted its signal via antenna to Oklahoma City and adjacent suburbs within a  radius – exclusively carried programming from HBO and SuperStation WTBS (now TBS) as well as, upon converting into a multichannel service in 1981, Nickelodeon. Antenna Vision was launched in 1990 as a 21-channel MMDS offering featuring broadcast stations, and a limited lineup of basic and premium channels from a transmitter atop the Liberty Bank Tower in downtown Oklahoma City (which had previously housed TV-Q and VEU's respective transmission facilities). Launched by Multimedia Cablevision, it made use of additional frequencies licensed to the service by the Federal Communications Commission (FCC), and reached a  radius covering most of Oklahoma, northern Cleveland and eastern Canadian Counties; American Telecasting purchased Antenna Vision in 1994, folding the latter provider into its WanTV wireless cable service (which remained in operation until 2001).

Oklahoma City also served as the pilot market for Video Entertainment Unlimited (VEU), a subscription service launched in October 1980 by Golden West Broadcasters over its then-fledgling independent station KAUT-TV, which transmitted the service during the nighttime hours seven days a week as well as on weekend afternoons. VEU – which was formatted similarly to premium cable networks (such as HBO and Showtime) as well as other over-the-air subscription television services of the time period (such as ONTV and SelecTV), offering a mix of unedited movies, music specials and sporting events – expanded to include affiliates in Dallas-Fort Worth and Atlanta; VEU – which was dropped by KAUT in September 1982, in favor of offering a full-time schedule of syndicated and local entertainment programs available for free to the entire media market – ceased operations on its two other affiliates in September 1984, as cable television service expanded its reach throughout the Dallas-Fort Worth and Atlanta markets.

Radio
As of September 2011, Oklahoma City is the 48th largest radio market in the United States, according to Arbitron. The following is a list of radio stations serving the Oklahoma City area:

AM
 640 KWPN Oklahoma City (Sports)
 800 KQCV Oklahoma City (Religious/Bott)*
 890 KTLR Oklahoma City (Christian)
 930 WKY Oklahoma City (Sports)
 1000 KTOK Oklahoma City (Talk)
 1140 KRMP Oklahoma City (Urban AC)
 1220 KTLV Midwest City (Gospel)
 1340 KGHM Oklahoma City (Sports)
 1400 KREF Norman (Sports)
 1460 KZUE El Reno (Spanish/variety)
 1520 KOKC Oklahoma City (Talk)
 1560 KEBC Del City (Sports)

FM
 88.1 KMSI Moore (Inspirational)*
 88.5 KZTH Piedmont (Christian contemporary)*
 88.9 KYLV Oklahoma City (K-Love)*
 89.3 KSSO Norman (Gospel)*
 90.1 KUCO Edmond (Classical)*
 90.9 KOKF Edmond (Air1)*
 91.7 KOSU Stillwater (NPR/modern rock)*
 92.5 KOMA Oklahoma City (Classic hits)
 93.3 KJKE Newcastle (Classic country)
 93.7 KSPI-FM Stillwater (Hot AC)
 94.7 KREF-FM Oklahoma City (Sports)
 95.1 KQCV-FM Shawnee (Religious/Bott)*
 96.1 KXXY-FM Oklahoma City (Classic country)
 96.9 KQOB Enid (Conservative talk)
 97.3 KKNG-FM Blanchard (Catholic/EWTN)
 98.1 WWLS-FM The Village (Sports)
 98.9 KYIS Oklahoma City (Hot AC)
 99.7 KNAH Mustang (Classic country)
 100.5 KATT-FM Oklahoma City (Rock)
 101.9 KTST Oklahoma City (Country)
 102.7 KJYO Oklahoma City (Contemporary hit radio)
 103.5 KVSP Anadarko (Mainstream urban)
 104.1 KMGL Oklahoma City (Adult contemporary)
 104.9 KKWD Bethany (Adult hits)
 105.3 KINB Kingfisher (Sports)
 105.7 KROU Spencer (NPR/jazz)*
 106.3 KGOU Norman (NPR/jazz)*
 106.7 KTUZ-FM Okarche (Spanish/variety)
 107.7 KRXO-FM Oklahoma City (Sports)

LPFM 

 93.9 KWDW-LP Oklahoma City (Spanish religious)*
 97.5 KCYI-LP Edmond (Smooth jazz)*
 97.7 KRGU-LP Midwest City (Spanish Catholic)*
 99.3 KHDD-LP Oklahoma City (Spanish Catholic)*
 99.3 KZUC-LP Edmond (Adult album alternative)*
 100.9 KSMJ-LP Edmond (Catholic)*
 101.3 KPCG-LP Edmond (Catholic)*

(*) - indicates a non-commercial station.

See also
 Oklahoma media
 List of newspapers in Oklahoma
 List of radio stations in Oklahoma
 List of television stations in Oklahoma
 Media of locales in Oklahoma: Broken Arrow, Lawton, Norman, Tulsa

References

External links
Oklahoma City Media List
Oklahoma Newspaper List

Oklahoma
Mass media in Oklahoma City
Mass media in Oklahoma